The Qatar Winter Sports Committee (QWSC) is the governing body of winter sports in Qatar.

History
The federation was founded in 2010, and it was accepted into the International Ice Hockey Federation (IIHF) on 18 May 2012. QWSC is currently a full member of the IIHF. The federation's current president is Khalil Al-Jabir. QWSC is affiliated to the Qatar Olympic Committee.

References

External links
IIHF profile
National Teams of Ice Hockey

2010 establishments in Qatar
Ice hockey governing bodies in Asia
Ice hockey in Qatar
International Ice Hockey Federation members
Sports organizations established in 2010
Ice Hockey